The Crazy Cajun can refer to:
Huey P. Meaux (1929–2011), American record producer, nicknamed The Crazy Cajun
Crazy Cajun Enterprises, cover company of recording studios including Capri Records owned by Huey P. Meaux
Crazy Cajun Records, recording studio and record label owned by Huey P. Meaux
"Crazy Cajun Cakewalk Band", 1967 song by Redbone on Redbone (album)
The Crazy Cajun Recordings, 1998 compilation album of Johnny Copeland music